Frank Pike may refer to:

 Private Pike, first name Frank, a fictional character in the British sitcom Dad's Army
 Frank Pike (soccer) (1930–2010), Canadian soccer player and coach
 Frank Pike (footballer) (1925–2011), Australian rules footballer
 Frank Pike (Arrowverse), a fictional character in the TV series Arrow

See also
 Frank Pyke (1941–2011), Australian sports scientist, Australian rules footballer and sports administrator